The Patsy T. Mink Central Oahu Regional Park (CORP) is a  public park operated by the City and County of Honolulu. It held its grand opening on July 21, 2001 and it is located in Waipio, Oahu just off the Kamehameha Highway.

The Central Oahu Regional Park complex currently includes a 20-court tennis center, which opened in 2003; the Veterans Memorial Aquatic Center, four youth baseball diamonds, four regulation size baseball diamonds, a four diamond softball complex, as well as other multipurpose fields, and a 20-lane archery range.

CORP plays host to many different sporting events including swimming, baseball, soccer, football etc. It is also the home field for the Hawaii Pacific University Sea Warrior baseball team, the Chaminade University Silversword softball team as well as being the home of the 2007 Hawaii High School Athletic Association (HHSAA) Softball Tournament. 

The Hanwha Eagles (Korea Baseball Organization) uses the baseball field annually during spring training.

The park was renamed after U.S. Representative Patsy Mink in 2007.

Current facilities 
4  Youth Baseball Fields
4  Regulation Baseball Fields
4  Regulation Softball Fields
20 Tennis Courts
Olympic Size Swimming Pool
1 meter and 3 meter Springboards (Diving Boards)
Multipurpose Fields
Archery Range

Planned facilities 
Tennis Stadium
A Basketball Court is rumored
Equestrian Center

Notable events
 Junior Pan Pacific Swimming Championships: 2012, 2022

References

External links

American football venues in Hawaii
Baseball venues in Hawaii
Chaminade Silverswords
College softball venues in the United States
College tennis venues in the United States
Hawaii Pacific Sharks
Parks in Hawaii
Protected areas of Oahu
Soccer venues in Hawaii
Softball venues in Hawaii
Swimming venues in Hawaii
Tennis venues in Hawaii
Protected areas established in 2001
Sports venues in Hawaii
Sports venues completed in 2001
2001 establishments in Hawaii
Sports complexes in the United States